Raphael Rudnik (April 30, 1933 – June 22, 2009) was an American poet and literary scout. He was a graduate of Bard College (B.A., 1955) and Columbia University (M.A., 1968). He published the poetry collections, A Lesson From the Cyclops (Vintage, 1969), In The Heart or Our City (Random House, 1972), and Frank, 207 (Ohio University Press, 1982). The recipient of a Guggenheim Fellowship for poetry and the Mildred L. Batchelder Award for translation, his poems have appeared in The New Yorker, The Quarterly Review of Literature, New Directions, and other journals. A completed book-length poem, On the Train, is in manuscript. He taught literature at Columbia University and elsewhere.

Works (Lessons from a Cyclops.)

External links
  (including 1 'from old catalog')

1933 births
2009 deaths
American male poets
Bard College alumni
Columbia University alumni
20th-century American poets
20th-century American male writers